The Tulsa Performing Arts Center, or Tulsa PAC, is a performing arts venue in the city of Tulsa, Oklahoma. It houses four main theatres, a studio space, an art gallery and a sizeable reception hall. Its largest theater is the 2,365-seat Chapman Music Hall.  The Center regularly hosts events by 14 local performance groups. Tulsa Ballet, Tulsa Opera, Tulsa Symphony, and Celebrity Attractions (Broadway series) are among the Tulsa PAC's major clients. Tulsa Town Hall, Chamber Music Tulsa, Theatre Tulsa, American Theatre Company, Theatre Pops, Playhouse Tulsa, Theatre North, and the PAC Trust  also fill the PAC calendar.

Numerous headliners such as Michael Bublé, Kelly Clarkson, Steve Martin and Anthony Bourdain have appeared at the Tulsa Performing Arts Center. The complex was built with a combination of public and private funds and opened in 1977.  The building is home to a permanent collection of 76 works of art.

The Tulsa Performing Arts Center launched a regional ticketing company, run by the Tulsa PAC, in 2006.  MyTicketOffice.com handles the ticketing for 12 performance arts venues in Oklahoma and Texas.

History
The Tulsa PAC opened March 19, 1977, and was built with a combination of public and private funds. Minoru Yamasaki (who designed the former World Trade Center Towers) was the architect for the project. The Center is owned and operated by the City of Tulsa and guided by the TPAC Trust, of which the Mayor of Tulsa is a member. Its first Managing Director was Robert D'Angelo. The PAC's current director, Mark Frie, became director in June 2017.

The forerunner of the Tulsa Performing Arts Center was the Tulsa Municipal Theatre, now known as the Brady Theatre. When, in the early 1970s, it was determined that a new, updated theatre was needed, the Theatre Advisory Committee, headed by Charles E. Norman, was formed. Many different scenarios were studied, including the restoration of the Tulsa Municipal Theatre (built in 1914), and the Akdar Shrine theatre (vintage 1925). The committee became aware that John H. Williams, president of The Williams Companies, had purchased a nine-block area of land that he intended to develop. Williams’ original plan was to build a new headquarters for his company, which would consist of two 30-story buildings flanking Boston Avenue at 3rd Street. The scheme was reconfigured to make Williams’ headquarters one tall tower instead of two smaller buildings, and locate it in the middle of Boston Avenue at Second Street.  The land between 2nd and 3rd Streets on Cincinnati, occupied by a vacant Hotel Tulsa, was then made available and was given to the City by Williams for a performing arts venue. In May 1973, Williams and community philanthropist Leta Chapman made an offer to the citizens of Tulsa: If Tulsa citizens would vote to fund half of a performing arts center, Williams and Chapman would raise the other half. A bond campaign was launched, giving the proposed PAC the slogan “Everyone’s Place.”  The bond election, held in August 1973, was passed by 69%. The new Tulsa PAC was funded at $14 million.

Construction
Prior to construction, a private corporation, PACI, was formed to take over the ownership of the construction project and then return the PAC property back to the City of Tulsa after building completion.  This allowed for construction to move ahead at greater speed ahead of the rampant inflation.  A committee was formed to procure art for the building. One percent of all construction costs of public buildings in Tulsa must be spent on art for the building being constructed to comply with an ordinance adopted by the City of Tulsa in 1969. A combination of local, national and international art, including a large representation of Native American art, was purchased. The works of artists such as Alexandre Hogue, Wolf Kahn, Barbara Hepworth, Louise Nevelson and Woody Crumbo were among the original collection. The initial plan for the Tulsa PAC was for one large performance hall seating almost 2,400 and a smaller proscenium theater seating approximately 430. During the initial construction phase, two more studio theaters were added to the plans. The acoustics for the facility were the work of Bolt, Berenek and Newman, the firm responsible for the acoustics at Lincoln Center in New York City. Ultimately, the cost of building the Tulsa PAC was approximately $19 million. Additional revenue sources were found to fund the difference.

The facility underwent a major retrofit in the early 1990s to help the PAC become more accessible to people with disabilities. In 2000, the PAC completed a major expansion that included an additional studio theater, a large reception hall and a large suite of restrooms. This was the second addition of restrooms since the building opened in 1977.

Performance venues
The Tulsa PAC has four main performance venues: Chapman Music Hall, John H. Williams Theatre, Liddy Doenges Theatre and Charles E. Norman Theatre. The PAC also houses two smaller event venues, the Kathleen P. Westby Pavilion and the Robert J. LaFortune Studio.

Chapman Music Hall
Accommodating 2,365 in Continental-style seating, Chapman Music Hall is the largest venue at the PAC. World-renowned talents, like Tony Bennett, Luciano Pavarotti, Norah Jones, Michael Bublé, Kelly Clarkson, Mikhail Baryshnikov, Steve Martin and Itzhak Perlman, as well as touring Broadway musicals, such as The Book of Mormon, The Lion King, Wicked, Jersey Boys and The Phantom of the Opera have all played in this theatre. Ella Fitzgerald and the Tulsa Philharmonic were the opening entertainment in Chapman Music Hall on March 19, 1977.

John H. Williams Theatre
A scaled-down replica of Chapman Music Hall, the intimate John H. Williams Theatre seats 437 people. It opened in March 1977 at the same time as Chapman Music Hall and the former Studio I and Studio II. Chamber music, piano soloists, a variety of theatre productions, poetry readings and Celtic music concerts have been staged in the theater. Notable performers include U.S. Poet Laureate Billy Collins, classical pianist Awadagin Pratt, jazz singer Marilyn Maye, guitarist Tommy Emmanuel and singer Janice Ian.

Liddy Doenges Theatre
The former Studio I was renamed in 1994 following the death of arts patron Liddy Doenges who served on the TPAC Trust. This “black box” theater can accommodate up to 300 people in non-fixed seating.  Theatre productions, special events and cabarets are frequently staged in the Doenges Theatre.

Charles E. Norman Theatre
Charles E. Norman was one of the key city leaders who played a crucial role during the pre-construction and construction phase of the Tulsa Performing Arts Center. He served on the TPAC Trust until his death in 2010. The former Studio II was renamed for him in 2000. This theater seats approximately 200. Theatre productions, receptions, cabaret-style performances, master classes and rehearsals are the theater's main business.

Other amenities

Robert J. LaFortune Studio
This space is used as a cabaret theatre during the PAC's Trust's annual SummerStage festival, and also is a setting for press conferences, pre-curtain lectures, master classes and cast parties. It can comfortably seat 100 at tables, and more with a combined table/riser seating arrangement. There is lecture seating for 200. Robert J. LaFortune was Tulsa's mayor during the PAC's construction phase.

Kathleen P. Westby Pavilion
This 49’ x 64’ reception hall, nearly 3,000-square feet, can seat approximately 160 at tables and 240 lecture-style. The Pavilion is ideal for pre- and post-performance gatherings, galas, small concerts and press conferences. The PAC honored longtime Tulsa PAC Trust member Katie Westby by naming the hall for her in 2000. Westby oversaw the formation of the Performing Arts Center's permanent art collection. The PAC currently rents this hall to the public for a range of social and cultural activities.

Accomplishments and recognition
2015 "Best Performing Arts Space (Tulsa Voice readers);  2015 A-List Winner (Tulsa People); "Best Performing Arts Venue" (Tulsa World readers); 2015 Certificate of Excellence (Trip Advisor)

The Tulsa Performing Arts Center was one of the first 15 performing arts centers in the United States with a website.

The Tulsa Performing Arts Center ticket office was named the 2013 “Outstanding Box Office” by the International Ticketing Association (INTIX).

The Tulsa PAC's INTERMISSION Magazine was awarded “PR Magazine of the Year” in 2011 and 2013 in the Great Plains Journalism competition.

INTERMISSION also earned First Place for Best Public Relations Magazine in 2006-07, awarded by the Society of Professional Journalists. 
Tulsa People Magazine voted the Tulsa Performing Arts Center “Best Venue to Hear Music,” first choice, 1994.

Oklahoma Magazine voted the Tulsa PAC “Place to See and Be Seen,” 2008.

The Tulsa Performing Arts Center won the International Ticketing Association Outstanding Box Office Award, 2013

References

External links
 

Performing arts centers in Oklahoma
Buildings and structures in Tulsa, Oklahoma
Culture of Tulsa, Oklahoma
Economy of Tulsa, Oklahoma
Buildings and structures completed in 1977
Music venues completed in 1977
Theatres completed in 1977
Minoru Yamasaki buildings
Tourist attractions in Tulsa, Oklahoma